Hydroxyacetone, also known as acetol, is the organic chemical with the formula CH3C(O)CH2OH.  It consists of a primary alcohol substituent on acetone. It is an α-hydroxyketone, also called a ketol, and is the simplest hydroxy ketone structure.  It is a colorless, distillable liquid.

Preparation
It is produced commercially by dehydration of glycerol.

Hydroxyacetone is commercially available, but it also may be synthesized on a laboratory scale by a substitution reaction on bromoacetone.

Reactions
It undergoes rapid polymerization, including forming a hemiacetal cyclic dimer. Under alkaline conditions, it undergoes a rapid aldol condensation.

Hydroxyacetone can be produced by degradation of various sugars. In foods, it is formed by the Maillard reaction.  It reacts further to form other compounds with various aromas. As such it finds some use as a flavoring.

See also
 Acyloin, the simplest secondary α-hydroxy ketone.

References

External links

Alpha-hydroxy ketones